Darshan Singh Kaypee was a leader of Indian National Congress from Punjab, India. He was a member of Punjab Legislative Assembly elected for five times from  Jalandhar. He was shot dead by militants in 1992.

References

Victims of Sikh terrorism
1992 deaths
Members of the Punjab Legislative Assembly
People from Jalandhar district
People murdered in Punjab, India
Victims of the insurgency in Punjab
Assassinated Indian politicians
Year of birth missing
Indian National Congress politicians from Punjab, India